Combal.Zero is an Italian restaurant in Rivoli, Italy by chef Davide Scabin. The restaurant first opened in 1994 as Combal and was renamed to Combal.Zero in 2000 when it moved to the Castle of Rivoli. It occupies a wing of the castle, which dates back to before the 11th century.

Recognition
Combal.Zero is consistently listed among the 100 best restaurants in the world. The restaurant has earned 2 Michelin Guide stars but lost one star in 2015. The restaurant is known for its innovative, experimental cuisine and in particular the "Cyber Egg". Restaurant magazine lauded its "hyper-creative, conceptual tasting menu". 

Combal.Zero was voted 28th best in the world in 2011, having risen from the 46th place in 2007.  In the 2015 rankings it fell back to 65th place. In 2018, Combal.Zero was ranked 59th on the list.

References

External links
Official Website
Italian Restaurant

Restaurants in Italy
Michelin Guide starred restaurants in Italy